Oldham East and Saddleworth is a constituency in outer Greater Manchester represented in the House of Commons of the UK Parliament since January 2011 by Debbie Abrahams of the Labour Party.

Boundaries and constituency profile

1997–2010: The Metropolitan Borough of Oldham wards of Crompton, Lees, St James', St Mary's, Saddleworth East, Saddleworth West, Shaw, and Waterhead, and the Metropolitan Borough of Rochdale ward of Milnrow.

2010–present: The Metropolitan Borough of Oldham wards of Alexandra, Crompton, St James', St Mary's, Saddleworth North, Saddleworth South, Saddleworth West and Lees, Shaw, and Waterhead.

Oldham East and Saddleworth is the largest constituency in Greater Manchester by area, and is one of three covering the Metropolitan Borough of Oldham. According to the Manchester Evening News it is "... a juxtaposition of downbeat urban terraces and the rolling Pennine hills."

UK Polling Report describes it as "a constituency at the eastern side of Greater Manchester, reaching from central Oldham up into the Pennines and Saddleworth Moor". It characterises East Oldham as "an area of deprived terraces and racial tensions", Shaw and Crompton as "relatively prosperous" and Saddleworth as composed of "middle-class villages and hamlets".

Within its bounds are the eastern fringes of Oldham (such as Derker, Glodwick, Greenacres, and Sholver), Shaw and Crompton, Lees, and Saddleworth (the latter of which includes the rural villages of Delph, Denshaw, Diggle, Dobcross, Greenfield and Uppermill). Between 1997 and 2010, Oldham East and Saddleworth incorporated the suburban town of Milnrow in the Metropolitan Borough of Rochdale when boundary changes placed it in the neighbouring Rochdale constituency.

For the 2011 by-election The Guardian described the constituency as "[Culturally] ... a shotgun marriage [likened to] ... Coronation Street meets Last of the Summer Wine, Salford combined with Holmfirth."

History
The seat was established for the 1997 general election from parts of the former Littleborough and Saddleworth and Oldham Central and Royton constituencies. Oldham Central and Royton was a safe Labour seat whereas Littleborough and Saddleworth had had a Conservative MP, Geoffrey Dickens, from its creation until a 1995 close three-party fought by-election where it was lost to a Liberal Democrat.  Ahead of the 1997 general election the seat was notionally Conservative, however since 1997 the seat has been a Labour/Liberal Democrat marginal. Although Phil Woolas of the Labour Party (defeated candidate in the mentioned 1995 by-election) was victorious in all three general elections since, his majorities have not been substantial and the Conservative vote increased from 16% to 24%.

At the 2001 general election, the far-right British National Party gained over 5,000 votes (an 11.2% share), retaining their deposit partly as Nick Griffin stood in the neighbouring West seat. Along with the BNP's showing in the neighbouring Oldham West and Royton constituency, this was interpreted as a reaction to the 2001 Oldham race riots. At the 2005 election the BNP's share of the vote dropped to 4.9%.

For the 2010 general election the seat lost the Milnrow and Newhey ward to the neighbouring Rochdale constituency and gained part of Alexandra ward from Oldham West and Royton.

After losing the 2010 general election by 103 votes, Liberal Democrat candidate Elwyn Watkins submitted a petition for a hearing by an election court, claiming that campaign literature issued by his Labour opponent Phil Woolas breached the Representation of the People Act 1983 by making false statements about his personal character. On 5 November 2010, the election court upheld the petition and declared the election void after reporting Phil Woolas guilty of making false election statements. Woolas sought a judicial review of the decision in the Administrative Division of the High Court, which upheld the decision of the Election Court in relation to two statements, whilst quashing the decision in relation to a third. As a result, the 2011 Oldham East and Saddleworth by-election was needed. By the time it was held, the Liberal Democrats had supported an increase in tuition fees, despite a manifesto commitment to oppose any such increase. This caused a significant drop in their polling numbers nationally, but one media report nevertheless stated the seat was "ultra-marginal between Labour and the Liberal Democrats". The by-election took place on 13 January 2011 and was contested by ten candidates. The Labour Party candidate Debbie Abrahams won.

Members of Parliament

Elections

Elections in the 2010s

Elections in the 2000s

Elections in the 1990s

Chris Davies was MP for the former Littleborough and Saddleworth seat since the 1995 by-election.

See also
 List of parliamentary constituencies in Greater Manchester

Notes

References

Parliamentary constituencies in Greater Manchester
Constituencies of the Parliament of the United Kingdom established in 1997
Politics of the Metropolitan Borough of Oldham